Babiya Birta, or Baviyavirta was a village development committee in Morang District in the Kosi Zone of south-eastern Nepal. At the time of the 1991 Nepal census it had a population of 12,979 people living in 2476 individual households.

The VDC is now part of Rangeli municipality, wards 1 and 2.

References

Village development committees in Morang District
Rangeli Municipality